Paulina Krupińska (born 22 June 1987) is the Polish beauty pageant titleholder who was crowned Miss Poland 2012 and represented Poland at the Miss Universe 2013 pageant in Moscow, Russia. She won the Miss Photogenic award.

Early life
In 1987, Krupinska was born in Warsaw, Mazowieckie in Poland.

Miss Polonia
Krupinska was crowned Miss Polonia 2012 by Marcelina Zawadzka (Miss Polonia 2011) at the grand coronation night on 2 February 2013, hosted by Edyta Herbuś and Maciej Kurzajewski and broadcast on TVP2 from the ATM studio in Warsaw.

Miss Universe 2013
Krupinska represented Poland at the 62nd annual Miss Universe pageant on 9 November 2013 in Moscow, Russia.

References

External links
Official Miss Polonia website

1987 births
Living people
Miss Universe 2013 contestants
Models from Warsaw
Polish beauty pageant winners
Miss Polonia winners